Fargo City Detention Hospital is a building in Fargo, North Dakota, United States, that was built in 1910.  The hospital was designed as a place to sequester people afflicted with contagious disease. 

It's a two-story brick and tile building, designed by Frank Anders and built principally by C.H. Johnson. It had coal storage capacity of 40 tons.

It was listed on the National Register of Historic Places in 1987.

References

Hospital buildings completed in 1910
Buildings and structures in Fargo, North Dakota
Hospital buildings on the National Register of Historic Places in North Dakota
National Register of Historic Places in Cass County, North Dakota
1910 establishments in North Dakota